Ayotte Drums is a drum manufacturer based in Bedford, Quebec.  Ayotte Drums was incorporated by Ray Ayotte in 1974, and has been manufacturing drums since 1982.  Their drums feature wooden hoops, made of Canadian maple.

Drums
Ayotte Drums are known for building drums with wooden hoops, as opposed to the metal rims found in most drums.  The company states that they use locally-grown eastern sugar maple for their drum shells, which are assembled in Bedford, Quebec.  The company targets the mid-range and high-end markets.   they offered three ranges of drums as well as drumsticks.

History 
Ayotte Drums was founded by Ray Ayotte, who began his career in the music and percussion business in 1966. Ayotte began selling drums in 1972.  The Ayotte Drums company was founded as a collaboration between Ray Ayotte, his brother George, and Odyssey Guitars' woodworker Attila Balogh, who was in charge of research and development.  The company started to manufacture high-quality custom drums from 1983.

On October 27, 1989, at the age of 41, Attila Balogh died in an accident while working late at the Granville workshop. Ray Ayotte was quoted as saying that Attila was "witty, gracious, sympathetic and very very kind, we could not have done what we've done without him". By the time of Balogh's death in 1989, the company employed several craftsmen.  In 1993, Ray Ayotte made the decision to forego drum retailing to concentrate on the manufacturing business.  This led to the departure of George Ayotte and on February 11, 1993, the name was changed to "Ayotte Drums Only inc".

In November 1994, a group of investors led by Louis Eisman, Bruce Allen and Sam Feldman invested in Ayotte, taking a controlling interest. The investment was to assist in expansion of the production facilities and to implement a worldwide marketing program. In July 1995, Ayotte raised capital through a company formed under the British Columbia Small Business Venture Capital program. The funds were used to expand the factory, purchase new equipment, and hire new staff. The product line was expanded to include drumsticks, and the dealer network expanded from eleven to over 200 dealers.

After Gregg Keplinger joined Ayotte Drums in 1995, he designed the Keplinger Snare Drum, a 3mm thick stainless steel shell fitted with wood hoops. Ayotte launched their second line of drums, called Drumsmith, in 1997. Drumsmith drums were designed to cater the medium-priced drum market.  They had maple shells and lacquer finishes, and were mass-produced in Taiwan.  The Drumsmith line was renamed Pro Maple DS in 1999 and production was moved to Vancouver.

In December 1997 the shareholders of Ayotte Drums Only Inc. tendered their shares under a reverse takeover bid made by ISI Ventures Inc. Ayotte Drums Only Inc. became a wholly owned subsidiary of ISI. The two entities later merged into one corporation, named Ayotte Music Inc, which was listed on the Alberta Stock Exchange under the trading symbol "AYO".  Ray Ayotte resigned as president and director of Ayotte Drums in August 1999.

Ayotte Drums opened an e-commerce website in November 1999. The company announced the site would offer drums, sticks, clothing, hardware and accessories at 55% below list price.

In 2002, Ayotte Drums was sold to Bill Jennison, who operated the business out of Abbostford, BC. He moved the company to Bedford, Quebec in 2010.  However the company suffered bankruptcy in 2012, and was acquired by Jean-Denis Beaudoin. Ray Ayotte rejoined Ayotte Drums in December 2013.

References

External links
 
 Ray Ayotte Interview NAMM Oral History Library (2007)

Manufacturing companies based in Quebec
Percussion instrument manufacturing companies
Musical instrument manufacturing companies of Canada